Gwynne is a hamlet in central Alberta, Canada within the County of Wetaskiwin No. 10.

History
In 1902, pioneer homesteader Charles Rodberg (known in his native Belgium as Chevalier Charles Rodberg de Walden) opened a store and post office along the railway and the area was known as Rodberg's Crossing, or Rodberg's Flat. Later the area was known as Diana, after his eldest child, and the Post Office was called the Diana Post Office. When the CPR arrived in 1905 the community was renamed to honor the wife of a railway official. Julia Maude Schreiber (née Gwynne) was the second wife of Sir Collingwood Schreiber (1831-1908), a railway builder, former chief engineer of the CPR and former federal deputy minister of railways and canals. Julia was president of the Ottawa Ladies' golf club and vice-regent of the Daughters of the Empire in Ottawa. It is doubtful that she ever set foot in the hamlet named after her.

Climate 
The Köppen Climate Classification subtype for this climate is "Dfb" (Warm Summer Continental Climate).

Demographics 

See also 
List of communities in Alberta
List of designated places in Alberta
List of hamlets in Alberta

References 

Hamlets in Alberta
Designated places in Alberta
County of Wetaskiwin No. 10